Australaugeneria iberica is a scale worm known from the Gulf of Cadiz in the north-east Atlantic Ocean from a depth of 2230m.

Taxonomic status
Australaugeneria iberica, known from a depth of 2230 m, is the only bathyal species in the genus; the remaining 3 species are known from depths of 30 m or less.

Description
Elytra 15 pairs (presumably; all 3 type specimens incomplete). Unpigmented. Lateral antennae inserted ventrally (beneath prostomium and median antenna). Notochaetae thinner than neurochaetae.

Commensalism
A. iberica is commensal. Its host taxa are alcyonacean corals such as Acanella or a similar genera.

References

Phyllodocida
Animals described in 2016